Desmatosuchinae is a major subfamily of aetosaurs within the clade Desmatosuchia. It is a stem-based taxon defined as all aetosaurs more closely related to Desmatosuchus than to Stagonolepis, Aetosaurus, or Paratypothorax. 

The clade Desmatosuchinae has often been restricted to a few closely-related aetosaurs with spiny armor, such as Desmatosuchus, Longosuchus, and Lucasuchus. It was later expanded to include a number of Stagonolepis-like aetosaurs with less specialized armor. Under this more expansive usage, the strongly-supported clade encompassing "traditional" desmatosuchines (sensu stricto) was given a new name, Desmatosuchini. Synapomorphies that diagnose this clade can be found in the osteoderms. These include tongue-and-groove articulations for lateral plates present in dorsal presacral paramedian plates and large spikes on the lateral cervical, dorsal, and caudal plates.

References

Aetosaurs
Late Triassic first appearances